Ushino Dam  is a rockfill dam located in Miyagi Prefecture in Japan. The dam is used for irrigation. The catchment area of the dam is 3 km2. The dam impounds about 12  ha of land when full and can store 500 thousand cubic meters of water. The construction of the dam was completed in 1972.

See also
List of dams in Japan

References

Dams in Miyagi Prefecture